A feral information system is part of an information system developed by individuals and groups to help with day-to-day activities that is not condoned by management.  It is called feral because it circumvents existing information technology systems or works around key system architecture.  It is important to note that feral information systems are considered part of the experience of performing work duties.

Overview
A feral information system can be written for a variety of reasons.  The general reason given is that they are ways of working around existing management information systems in order to support day-to-day work.  Feral information systems are sometimes referred to as shadow systems.

Reasons for feral information systems
Reasons for feral information systems include: poor training practices in IT firms, inadequate systems, complex political relationships and a host of related issues. Recent research has linked feral information systems to poor operational planning.

References

Further reading
 

Information systems